The Roman Catholic Diocese of Yopougon is a diocese located in the city of Yopougon in the Ecclesiastical province of Abidjan in Côte d'Ivoire.

History
 June 8, 1982: Established as Diocese of Yopougon from the Metropolitan Archdiocese of Abidjan

Special churches
The Cathedral is the Cathédrale Saint-André in Yopougon.

Bishops
 Bishops of Yopougon (Roman rite)
 Bishop Laurent Akran Mandjo (1982.06.08 - 2015.11.28); Bishop Emeritus - Deceased
 Bishop Jean Salomon Lezoutie (2015.11.28 - Present); formerly, Coadjutor Bishop of the same Diocese

Coadjutor Bishop
Jean Salomon Lezoutié (2009 - 2015)

Other priests of this diocese who became bishops
Ignace Bessi Dogbo, appointed Bishop of Katiola in 2004
Bruno Essoh Yedoh, appointed Bishop of Bondoukou in 2019

See also
Roman Catholicism in Côte d'Ivoire
List of Roman Catholic dioceses in Côte d'Ivoire

References

Sources
 GCatholic.org
 Catholic Hierarchy

Yopougon
Yopougon
Yopougon
Organizations based in Abidjan
1982 establishments in Ivory Coast
Roman Catholic Ecclesiastical Province of Abidjan